The Curly Girl Method is an approach to hair care designed by author Lorraine Massey for natural hair (coils, waves and curls) that has not been chemically relaxed. This method discourages the daily use of sulfate shampoo, which is considered too harsh for curly hair. Among other things, it calls for the use of a cleansing conditioner in place of shampoo (also called "conditioner washing" or "co-washing"), no silicones (used in many commercial conditioners and styling products), the use of a diffuser when blowdrying, and no combs, brushes, or terrycloth towels. It also includes tips for using hair gel and other styling products. The aim in general is to treat naturally curly hair gently, minimizing damage to the hair cuticle; to keep it moisturized, since curly hair is more prone to dryness than straight hair; and, perhaps most significantly, to accentuate rather than interfere with the hair's natural curl pattern.

The Andre Walker Hair Typing System and Fia's hair typing system groups curly types from 2 to 4 and A to C (representing increasing tightness of the curl) with type 1 representing the complete absence of curl (or straight hair). Type 2 typically encompasses varying degrees of wavy hair, Type 3 contains loose, spiraled curls, and Type 4 includes tighter curls, kinks, and coils. Type A tends to be less defined than B and C, and when going from A to C the hair is more likely to be well-defined.

History

While variations of the method had been in use before then, in 2001, it was introduced to a wider audience by hairstylist Lorraine Massey, founder of the Devachan Salons. Lorraine had parted ways with DevaCurl few years ago and is now the owner and founder of Curly World products and Spiral XYZ Curl Salon in New York City. When Curly Girl: The Handbook was first published, straight hair was the prevailing style for women in the United States, the United Kingdom, and elsewhere, and many women felt pressured to straighten their hair with flat irons or chemical relaxers. Massey writes in her introduction about growing up in England, where she was ridiculed for having curly hair. When she moved to New York City, she had an eye-opening experience: "Jewish, Italian, Latino, and African-American people living around me had curly hair that looked like mine! I no longer looked or felt like an outsider."

Since the early 2010s, curly hairstyles have become more popular and championed by many celebrities.

Variations

People with various hair textures have adapted the method to their needs. Popular variations include the use of sulfate-free shampoos, which are more widely available now than they were in 2001, and occasional blow-drying with the use of heat protectants and a diffuser instead of a regular hair dryer. An additional essential step in the curly hair care routine includes the use of deep conditioners once a week. These deep conditioning treatments work more effectively if they are performed regularly once a week. Application of heat by using thermal heat caps helps deep conditioners penetrate the cuticle better leaving the hair more moisturised.

The method is also used by men; the name "curly girl" reflects the relative importance of hair care to women and girls due to societal expectations. The method can also be used on kinky, coily, and wavy hair, which are often treated as curly hair types or "curl patterns" on hair care websites and in hair typing systems.

As co-washing has become more popular, consumer demand has spawned a new hair product, the "cleansing co-wash", which proponents claim removes buildup from the hair and scalp without the harsh "stripping" or drying effects of traditional shampoo.

Massey's book also includes techniques for cutting curly hair, such as cutting the hair when dry rather than wet. Related hair cutting techniques include the Deva cut, Ouidad cut, and RI CI cut. Deva Cut, which is created by Lorraine Massey, is widely popular now. It involves cutting each curl individually and at an angle so as to not disrupt the curl pattern.

Other authors have written curly hair care guides which focus on specific hair types. Curly Like Me: How to Grow Your Hair Healthy, Long, and Strong by Teri LaFlesh provides natural hair care tips especially for tight curls. Better than Good Hair: The Curly Girl Guide to Healthy, Gorgeous Natural Hair by Nikki Walton focuses on afro-textured hair. Writers at the Naturally Curly website provide hair care advice based on curl pattern, porosity, density, hair thickness and other factors.

The curly girl method also requires one to know one's hair porosity. There are low, medium and high hair porosity. Low hair porosity is when the hair cuticles are tightly shut. Low porosity hair has difficulty obtaining moisture but once moisture is absorbed it will remain moisturized. This porosity type is common with hair that has suffered little to no damage (either from heat styling tools or from chemicals) and thus it is the preferred porosity level. Medium porosity hair is when the hair cuticles are loose, allowing moisture to be easily absorbed and retained. High porosity is when there are gaps in the hair cuticles which allows the hair to easily absorb the moisture but also easily lose the moisture just as easily as it was absorbed. These gaps are caused by long term damage to the hair from things like over-manipulation, heat damage and chemical damage from hair dyes and relaxers.

See also
 No poo
 Natural hair movement

References

External links

Hairdressing
Hairstyles
Human hair